KXK may refer to

Komsomolsk-on-Amur Airport (IATA code: KXK), an airbase and airport in Khabarovsk Krai, Russia
KxK Guitars, an American guitar manufacturer
Lahta language (ISO 639-3 code: kxk), a language of Burma

See also